Margaret Langrick (born 1971) is a Canadian writer and retired actress. She is now known as Maggie Langrick, and is the CEO of the publishing company Wonderwell.

Filmography

Films
My American Cousin (1985) as Sandy Wilcox
Harry and the Hendersons (1987) as Sarah Henderson
Earth Star Voyager (1988) as Luz Sansone
Martha, Ruth and Edie (1988) as Young Edie
Cold Comfort (1989) as Dolores Lucas
Thunderground (1989) as Casey
American Boyfriends (1989) as Sandy Wilcox
The Admiral and the Princess (1990) as voice of the Princess
A Friend to Die For (also known as Death of a Cheerleader in the UK - 1994) as Jill Anderson
Frankenstein: The College Years (1991)
Sweet Angel Mine (1996) as Rauchine

Television
Danger Bay TV series 1984-89 as Jenny (3 Episodes)
Camp Wilder TV series 1992-93 as Beth (All 19 Episodes)
Lonesome Dove: The Outlaw Years TV series 1995-96 as Selina (Ep 4 - Badlands, October 19, 1995)

Awards and nominations

External links 
 Official Site
 

Canadian film actresses
Canadian television actresses
Best Actress Genie and Canadian Screen Award winners
Living people
1971 births